The Wyoming Bandit is a 1949 American Western film directed by Philip Ford and written by M. Coates Webster. The film stars Allan Lane, Eddy Waller, Trevor Bardette, Victor Kilian, Rand Brooks and William Haade. The film was released on July 15, 1949, by Republic Pictures.

Plot

Cast    
Allan Lane as Rocky Lane 
Black Jack as Black Jack
Eddy Waller as Nugget Clark
Trevor Bardette as Wyoming Dan
Victor Kilian as Ross Tyler
Rand Brooks as Jimmy Howard
William Haade as Henchman Lonnigan
Harold Goodwin as Sheriff
Lane Bradford as Henchman Buck
Robert J. Wilke as Henchman Sam 
John Hamilton as Marshal
Edmund Cobb as Deputy Marshal

References

External links 
 

1949 films
American Western (genre) films
1949 Western (genre) films
Republic Pictures films
Films directed by Philip Ford
American black-and-white films
1940s English-language films
1940s American films